The 2017 season was the Los Angeles Rams' 80th in the National Football League (NFL), their 81st overall, their 51st in the Greater Los Angeles Area and their first under head coach Sean McVay. The Rams improved on their 4–12 record from the previous season. With a win over the Arizona Cardinals, the Rams ended a decade-long drought and clinched their first winning season since 2003 and first playoff appearance since 2004, when the club was based in St. Louis. The team played a game in London, England at Twickenham Stadium against the Arizona Cardinals in Week 7 as one of the NFL London Games.

For the second consecutive year, the Rams started out in first place in the NFC West with a 3–1 record. The Los Angeles Rams also scored 107 points in the first three games of the season, the second highest in franchise history and a league leader. Furthermore, the team went from being dead last in total offense the previous season with an NFL-low 224 points to becoming the highest scoring team in the league in 2017 with an average of 29.9 points per game and 478 total points scored - tops in both categories. On Christmas Eve, the Rams defeated the Tennessee Titans 27–23 in a Super Bowl XXXIV rematch to clinch the NFC West for the first time since 2003 and their first playoff berth since 2004. This was also their first playoff appearance as the Los Angeles Rams since the 1989 season and their first division title as the Los Angeles Rams since the 1985 season. Their promising season came to an end as they were defeated by the No. 6 seed and defending NFC Champions, the Atlanta Falcons, 13–26 in the Wild Card Round. Coincidentally in the Rams' last playoff game in 2005, they were also beaten by the Falcons. In the offseason, the Rams introduced a new logo, with the horns and the outline of the ram changing to white. It would be their logo for 3 years.

Offseason

Coaching changes
On January 20: The Rams hired Sean McVay as the team's new head coach. Interim head coach John Fassel, who had replaced Jeff Fisher following Fisher's firing in Week 12 of 2016 and also interviewed for the head coach position, was retained as special teams coordinator along with running backs coach Skip Peete and assistant offensive line coach Andy Dickerson.

On January 21: The Rams hired Wade Phillips as the team's new defensive coordinator.

On January 22: The Rams hired Matt LaFleur as the new offensive coordinator.

Uniform changes
The Rams underwent a moderate uniform change, removing New Century gold from their helmets and pants while leaving their jerseys unchanged. The Rams allowed their fans to decide on which pants stripes and facemask color they wanted the team to use via polls on their social media pages, with a single navy striped pants and white facemask winning. Additionally, the Rams wore navy pants with a single white stripe for some away games.

Draft

Notes
 The Rams traded their 2017 first-round selection (No. 5 overall), a 2017 third-round compensatory selection (No. 100 overall), along with their 2016 first-, two-second– and third-round selections to the Tennessee Titans in exchange for the Titans' 2016 first-, fourth- and sixth round selections.
 The rams were awarded an additional compensatory selection – No. 141 overall.

Undrafted free agents

Staff

Rosters

Opening training camp
<noinclude>

Final

Preseason
The Rams' preliminary preseason schedule was announced on April 10.

Regular season

Schedule
The Rams' regular season schedule was announced on April 20.

Note: Intra-division opponents are in bold text.

Game summaries

Week 1: vs. Indianapolis Colts

The Rams started their season with a blowout win over the Colts as Jared Goff got both his first victory and the first 300-yard passing game of his career, including a touchdown pass to rookie wide receiver Cooper Kupp. Cornerback Trumaine Johnson was named NFC Defensive Player of the Week after returning an interception 39 yards for the Rams' first touchdown of the season, while also recording two tackles including a forced fumble and a fumble recovery. Safety Lamarcus Joyner also returned an interception for a touchdown and added four tackles. Defensive end Michael Brockers had five tackles to lead the defense, which had four sacks and forced three turnovers as Sean McVay became the youngest head coach ever (31 years, 7 months, 2 weeks, 3 days) to win in his NFL debut.

Week 2: vs. Washington Redskins

Facing his former team, Sean McVay was dealt his first career defeat as the Rams fell behind 13–0. Todd Gurley had 132 yards in total offense and two scores, including the first receiving touchdown of his career on an 18-yard pass from Goff in which he hurdled Redskins cornerback Bashaud Breeland on his way to the end zone. Rookie tight end Gerald Everett turned in a strong performance with three receptions for 95 yards, while Alec Ogletree had 11 tackles including a sack on defense.

Week 3: at San Francisco 49ers
{{Americanfootballbox
|titlestyle=; text-align:center;
|state=autocollapse
|title=Week Three: Los Angeles Rams at San Francisco 49ers – Game summary
|date=
|time=5:25 pm. PDT
|road=Rams
|R1=14|R2=10|R3=10|R4=7
|home=49ers
|H1=7|H2=6|H3=7|H4=19
|stadium=Levi's Stadium, Santa Clara, California
|attendance=70,178
|weather=, mostly sunny
|referee=Jeff Triplette
|TV=NFLN/KNBC
|TVAnnouncers=Mike Tirico, Cris Collinsworth and Heather Cox
|reference=Recap, Gamebook
|scoring=
First quarter
 LAR – Todd Gurley 3-yard run (Greg Zuerlein kick), 0:03. Rams 7–0. Drive: 1 play, 3 yards,14:52.
 SF – Brian Hoyer 2-yard run (Robbie Gould kick), 6:31. Tied 7–7. Drive: 7 plays, 81 yards, 8:26.
 LAR – Todd Gurley 7-yard pass from Jared Goff (Greg Zuerlein kick), 3:45.Rams 14–7. Drive: 1 play, 8 yards,4:37.
Second quarter
 LAR – Greg Zuerlein 48-yard field goal, 3:10. Rams 17–7. Drive: 7 plays, 38 yards, 15:00.
 SF – Robbie Gould 36-yard field goal, 1:58. Rams 17–10. Drive: 4 plays, -6 yards, 9:42.
 SF – Robbie Gould 48-yard field goal, 4:44. Rams 17–13. Drive: 8 plays, 47 yards, 3:51.
 LAR – Todd Gurley 2-yard run (Greg Zuerlein kick), 2:57. Rams 24–13. Drive: 9 play, 75 yards, 0:55.
Third quarter
 LAR – Greg Zuerlein 19-yard field goal, 5:43. Rams 27–13. Drive: 10 plays, 74 yards, 9:20.
 SF – Carlos Hyde 3-yard run (Robbie Gould kick), 3:37. Rams 27–20. Drive: 10 plays, 75 yards, 5:44.
 LAR – Sammy Watkins 1-yard pass from Jared Goff (Greg Zuerlein kick), 5:23. Rams 34–20. Drive: 10 plays, 8 yards, 0:21.''Fourth quarter SF – Garrett Celek 1-yard pass from Brian Hoyer (kick failed) 5:30. Rams 34–26. Drive: 10 plays, 75 yards, 12:57.
 LAR – Sammy Watkins 12-yard pass from Jared Goff (Greg Zuerlein kick), 4:07. Rams 41–26. Drive: 7 plays, 8 yards, 8:47.
 SF – Trent Taylor 1-yard pass from Brian Hoyer (Robbie Gould kick), 1:27. Rams 41–33. Drive: 4 plays, 64 yards, 5:12.
 SF – Carlos Hyde 1-yard run (pass failed) 2:40. Rams 41–39. Drive: 8 plays, 71 yards, 2:17.
|stats=Top passers SF – Brian Hoyer – 23/37, 332 yards, 2 TD, INT
 LAR – Jared Goff – 22/28, 288 yards, 3 TDTop rushers SF – Carlos Hyde – 25 rushes, 84 yards, 2 TD
 LAR – Todd Gurley – 28 rushes, 113 yards, 2 TDTop receivers SF – Pierre Garcon – 7 receptions, 142 yards
 LAR – Robert Woods – 6 receptions, 108 yardsTop tacklers SF – Jimmie Ward – 7 solo tackles
 LAR – Alec Ogletree – 7 solo tackles, 2 assisted
}}
In their first NFC West matchup of the season, the Rams came out ahead of a high-scoring battle with the rival 49ers. As the game was on Thursday Night Football, the Rams wore their all-gold Color Rush uniforms for the first time since their final home game in St. Louis. With friends and family in attendance, Jared Goff (a Bay Area native) completed 22 of 28 passes for 288 yards and three touchdowns, two to Sammy Watkins. Both Watkins and Robert Woods surpassed 100 yards receiving on six receptions each. Todd Gurley caught one touchdown and ran for two more (his first three-TD effort in the NFL) to go along with his 149 yards in total offense. Nickell Robey-Coleman had an interception, a fumble recovery and five tackles to lead the Rams defense. As this was an NFL Color Rush game, the Rams went with their all-yellow uniforms for the first time since their final home game in St. Louis in 2015, which offset the host 49ers' all-black scheme.

Week 4: at Dallas Cowboys

Greg Zuerlein hit a team-record seven field goals and Todd Gurley totaled 215 offensive yards (121 rushing, 94 receiving) along with a spectacular 53-yard touchdown on a screen pass as the Rams defeated the favored Cowboys on the road. Both earned NFC Player of the Week honors for Special Teams and Offense, respectively. Mark Barron's eight tackles and an interception led the Rams defense. Because the Cowboys wore their white uniforms at home, the Rams wore their Millennium Blue uniforms with blue pants, which clashed terribly with their blue and white helmets. The Rams' uniform choice was widely derided by pro football pundits and on social media.

Week 5: vs. Seattle Seahawks

The Rams staked out a 10–0 lead in the second quarter, but were undone by two interceptions and three lost fumbles in losing to the visiting Seahawks. Tavon Austin scored the Rams' only touchdown on a 27-yard run in the second quarter. Starting with just over a minute left in the fourth quarter, Jared Goff drove the Rams 55 yards to the Seattle 20-yard line and just missed connecting with Cooper Kupp in the end zone for a potential game-winner in the final seconds. On defense, rookie strong safety John Johnson got his first career interception and returned it 69 yards while Mark Barron had 15 tackles.

Week 6: at Jacksonville Jaguars

The Rams got off to a fast start in Jacksonville as Pharoh Cooper returned the opening kickoff 103 yards for a touchdown, which earned him NFC Special Teams Player of the Week honors. The teams traded scores four times in the first quarter, with Greg Zuerlein converting a 56-yard field goal and Gerald Everett scoring on a 4-yard shovel pass from Jared Goff. In the second quarter, Cory Littleton blocked a punt by which Malcolm Brown picked up at the 8-yard-line for a touchdown. Zuerlein added a second field goal in the fourth quarter for the final margin. Nickell Robey-Coleman had an interception, and the Rams defense totaled five sacks of Jaguars quarterback Blake Bortles. Los Angeles, which had worn their blue-and-yellow throwback uniforms at home vs. Seattle the previous week, petitioned the NFL to allow them to wear the throwbacks on the road in Jacksonville, but their request was denied. With the host Jaguars wearing white, the Rams wore their Millennium Blue jerseys for the final time in franchise history, this time with white pants.

Week 7: vs. Arizona CardinalsNFL International Series'''

The Rams turned in a dominant performance over the NFC West rival Cardinals at London's Twickenham Stadium for their first-ever regular season victory outside the United States. Jared Goff threw for 235 yards and had a touchdown pass to Cooper Kupp (four receptions, 51 yards), with one interception. Goff also scored on a 9-yard run as the Rams built a 23-0 halftime lead. Todd Gurley had his fourth 100-yard rushing game of the season with 22 carries for 106 yards and a touchdown, plus four receptions for 48 yards. The Rams defense shut down Cardinals running back Adrian Peterson (12 carries, 21 yards) for the game and allowed only 196 total yards to Arizona. Cardinals quarterback Carson Palmer was hit hard by Rams linebacker Alec Ogletree as he threw late in the second quarter and the pass was picked off by Lamarcus Joyner to set up a Todd Gurley touchdown run. Palmer suffered a broken left arm on the play and was knocked out for the year (Palmer retired following the season). Mark Barron added another interception off Drew Stanton to set up the third of Greg Zuerlein's four field goals on the day. It was the Rams' first shutout victory since 2014, and their first-ever win in the NFL International Series. It was also one of two NFL London Games of the 2017 season to end in a shutout, the other being the New Orleans Saints' 20–0 victory over the Miami Dolphins in Wembley Stadium in Week 4.

Week 9: at New York Giants

Returning to action after their bye week, the Rams put on a dominating performance against the host Giants, who suffered their worst loss since 1964. Jared Goff was named NFC Offensive Player of the Week after throwing for 311 yards and four touchdowns, two to Robert Woods and one each to Tyler Higbee and Sammy Watkins. Todd Gurley scored a pair of rushing touchdowns and added a 44-yard catch-and-run that set up another. The Rams defense forced three turnovers, including fumble recoveries by Aaron Donald and Connor Barwin and an interception by Trumaine Johnson, all of which led to Rams scores. Their special teams also contributed to the win, with three field goals by Greg Zuerlein and a blocked punt by Cory Littleton also setting up a touchdown by the offense.

Week 10: vs. Houston Texans

Taking a 9–7 lead on three field goals by Greg Zuerlein during a quiet first half, the Rams exploded for three touchdowns during the third quarter of the Texans' first-ever visit to Los Angeles. Jared Goff passed for a career-high 355 yards and three touchdowns. Two went to Robert Woods, one of which went for 94 yards (the third-longest touchdown pass in Rams history), with the other going to Sammy Watkins. Meanwhile, the Rams defense forced four Texans turnovers, two of which were strip sack recoveries from Connor Barwin and Samson Ebukam while the other two were interceptions by linebacker Mark Barron and strong safety Blake Countess. Zuerlein closed out the Rams' fourth-straight win with his fourth field goal. The 7–2 start was the best for the Rams since 2001. They now have at least one home victory against all 31 other franchises.

Week 11: at Minnesota Vikings

The Rams took the opening kickoff and drove 75 yards in nine plays, capping the drive with a 6-yard touchdown run by Todd Gurley. After the Vikings tied the game in the second quarter on a Latavius Murray touchdown run, Los Angeles came close to regaining the lead when Jared Goff connected with Cooper Kupp near the goal line. But Vikings safety Anthony Harris stripped the ball from Kupp and recovered it, and the Rams never threatened to score again. Vikings quarterback Case Keenum bedeviled his former Ram teammates, passing for 280 yards and a touchdown as Minnesota scored 17 unanswered points in the fourth quarter. Alec Ogletree had 12 tackles in what would be the only loss on the road for the Rams during the regular season.

Week 12: vs. New Orleans Saints

Jared Goff passed for 354 yards and touchdowns to wide receivers Sammy Watkins and Josh Reynolds as the Rams grabbed an early lead and kept it throughout in holding off the eventual NFC South Division champions. Rookie wide receiver Cooper Kupp had a season-high eight receptions for 116 yards, and Greg Zuerlein added four field goals. On defense, both Aaron Donald and Robert Quinn had five tackles and a sack for the game. With the win over the New Orleans Saints, the Rams improved to 8–3, their first non-losing season since 2006.

Week 13: at Arizona Cardinals

The Rams jumped out to a 16-0 first quarter lead and never looked back against the host Cardinals. Tight end Gerald Everett and wide receiver Sammy Watkins both scored on touchdown passes from Jared Goff, and kicker Greg Zuerlein converted four field goals. The defense combined for a season-high seven sacks of Cardinals quarterback Blaine Gabbert, with Aaron Donald, Robert Quinn and Ethan Westbrooks totaling two sacks each. Cornerback Trumaine Johnson had a team-high seven tackles and Alec Ogletree picked off a Gabbert pass and returned it 41 yards for a touchdown. With the win over Arizona, the Rams improved to 9-3 and achieved their first winning season since 2003.

Week 14: vs. Philadelphia Eagles

The showdown between two of the NFC's top teams did not disappoint, as the first two picks in the 2016 NFL Draft faced off for the first time in a high-scoring game that featured four lead changes. Eagles quarterback Carson Wentz threw three touchdown passes in the second quarter as Philadelphia came back to stake out a 24-14 halftime lead. The Rams rallied in the third period as Jared Goff found Sammy Watkins for his second touchdown pass of the game and Blake Countess recovered a blocked punt for a score that put the Rams on top 28–24. Wentz drove the Eagles to the goal line and suffered what would be a season-ending torn ACL injury, but Wentz did not leave the field before throwing his fourth TD pass of the game to Alshon Jeffery to give Philadelphia a 31–28 lead. Early in the fourth quarter, Todd Gurley (13 carries, 96 yards) scored his second touchdown of the game to give the Rams a 35–31 advantage. But former Rams QB Nick Foles stepped in for the injured Wentz and engineered two scoring drives that ended in field goals for the Eagles, who took a 37–35 lead. With just seven seconds remaining, the Rams' last-ditch play went disastrously, as Tavon Austin fumbled a lateral from Pharoh Cooper which Eagles defensive end Brandon Graham ran in for a touchdown as time expired. With the loss, the Rams fell to 9-4 while the Eagles clinched the NFC East for the first time since 2013. This is also the first matchup between the Goff vs Wentz rivalry.

Week 15: at Seattle Seahawks

The Rams thoroughly dominated the Seahawks, rolling to a 40-point lead by the third quarter in their biggest-ever win in Seattle. Running back Todd Gurley ran 21 times for 152 yards and three touchdowns, while also catching three passes for 28 yards and another score and was named NFC Offensive Player of the Week. The Rams defense menaced Seahawks quarterback Russell Wilson all day long with seven sacks, three coming from Aaron Donald and two more credited to Robert Quinn). Kicker Greg Zuerlein kicked two field goals and four PATs to add to his league-leading total of 158 points, but aggravated a back injury so severely that he was placed on injured reserve soon after the game. The Rams improved to 10-4 as head coach Sean McVay became the youngest coach to win 10 regular season games since 1937.

Week 16: at Tennessee Titans

In this Super Bowl XXXIV rematch, the Rams clinched their first NFC Western Division title since 2003 in a wild shootout with the Titans in Nashville. Running back Todd Gurley repeated as NFC Offensive Player of the Week after finishing with 22 carries for 118 yards and 10 catches for 158 yards and 2 TDs, including an 80-yard catch-and-run in the second quarter. Trailing by three in the fourth quarter, Jared Goff engineered the first comeback win of his professional career, completing 22 of 38 passes for 301 yards and four touchdowns, the last going to Cooper Kupp on a 14-yard scoring strike with 11:51 remaining. The Rams defense made the lead stick, holding the host Titans scoreless on their final three drives. The victory also guaranteed the Rams their first playoff berth since 2004.

Week 17: vs. San Francisco 49ers

With no chance to improve his team's standing, Rams head coach Sean McVay opted to rest most of his starting lineup for the season finale. The 49ers got their fifth straight win to close the season as Jimmy Garoppolo passed for 292 yards and two touchdowns while Carlos Hyde ran for two more scores for San Francisco. Rams replacement kicker Sam Ficken kicked a pair of field goals in the first half and backup running back Lance Dunbar scored on an 8-yard run in the fourth quarter. Sean Mannion made his first pro start for the Rams at quarterback, going 20-of-34 for 169 yards. On defense, cornerback Kevin Peterson led the Rams in tackles (eight), pass deflections (five), and interceptions (two) as the Rams finished with an 11–5 record. The Rams wore their classic blue-and-yellow throwback uniforms for the second time in the season.

Standings

Division

Conference

Postseason

NFC Wild Card Playoffs: vs. (6) Atlanta Falcons

The Los Angeles Rams hosted their first playoff game in the Greater Los Angeles Area since 1985, and their first playoff game at the Los Angeles Memorial Coliseum since the 1978 NFC Championship Game. But the defending conference champion Falcons started off strong, capitalizing on two special teams miscues by the Rams to build a 13–0 lead on two Matt Bryant field goals and a 3-yard run by Devonta Freeman. Los Angeles rallied as Jared Goff connected with Cooper Kupp on a 14-yard touchdown pass and Sam Ficken hit a 35-yard field goal just before halftime. Todd Gurley was effective with 101 yards on just 14 carries, but the Falcons were able to control the clock, dominating time of possession 37:35 to 22:25. The teams traded field goals in the second half, but Atlanta pulled away late as quarterback Matt Ryan iced the game with an 8-yard touchdown pass to wide receiver Julio Jones for the final 26-13 margin. Rams wide receiver Robert Woods had nine receptions for 142 yards in the loss, the Rams franchise's first playoff appearance since 2004 where, coincidentally, their loss also came to the Falcons.

Awards and honors

References

External links
 

Los Angeles
Los Angeles Rams seasons
Los Angeles Rams
2017 in Los Angeles
NFC West championship seasons